The filí (singular: file) were members of an elite class of poets in Ireland and Scotland, up until the Renaissance.

Etymology

The word "file" is thought to derive from the Proto-Celtic *widluios, meaning "seer, one who sees" (attested on the Gaulish inscription from Larzac as "uidluias", which is the feminine genitive singular form), derived ultimately from the verb *widlu-, "to see". This may suggest that the filí were originally prophetic poets, who foretold the future in the form of verse or riddle, rather than simply poets.

Elite scholars

According to the Textbook of Irish Literature, by Eleanor Hull:

Oral tradition

The fili maintained an oral tradition that predated the Christianisation of Ireland.  In this tradition, poetic and musical forms are important not only for aesthetics, but also for their mnemonic value.  The tradition allowed plenty of room for improvisation and personal expression, especially in regard to creative hyperbole and clever kenning.  However, the culture placed great importance on the fili's ability to pass stories and information down through the generations without making changes in those elements that were considered factual rather than embellishment.

In this manner, a significant corpus of pre-Christian myth and epic literature remained largely intact many centuries into the Christian era.  Much of it was first recorded in writing by scholarly Christian monks.  The synergy between the rich and ancient indigenous oral literary tradition and the classical tradition resulted in an explosion of monastic literature that included epics of war, love stories, nature poetry, saint tales and so forth which collectively resulted in the largest corpus of non-Latin literature seen in Europe since Ancient Greece.

Decline

The ultimate accommodation of Christianity within Irish Gaelic society resulted in a strain on the resources of the Chiefs and in that they were required to provide land and titles for both fili and bishop alike. Consequently, a decision was made in the 6th century to limit the number of fili to certain families who were respected and believed to be poets as a birthright. The greatest of these families included the Ó Dálaigh (O'Daly), several of whom were accorded the rank of 'chief ollamh of poetry of all Ireland,' and Ó hUiginn (O'Higgins) who were hereditary filí in more than one Gaelic house such as O'Conor Slighit, The MacDermotts, The McDonagh and O'Doherty.  The Ó Cobhthaigh (Coffey's) were known as the fili of Uisneach.

The Ó Maol Chonaire were chiefly Ollamhs of the Síol Muireadhaigh, the Ó Conchubhair Donn and the MacDermot of Moylurg, although this family was also associated with Ulster and spread from Connacht into the courts of Munster and Leinster. Finally the Ó Cléirighs who served the O'Donnel chieftains of Tír Connell.

The hereditary poets that were a fixture of court life in medieval Ireland serving as entertainers, advisors and genealogists maintained practices of and enjoyed a similar status as the pre-Christian fili.  But from the 12th century onwards, Anglo-Norman elements had increasing influence on Irish society. As Gaelic culture waned, these folk became increasingly involved with written literature and such non-native traditions as heraldry. Nonetheless in Gaelic society the chief filí of the province, or Ollamh, was seen as equal status to the Ard-rí, or High King. This high social status existed right into Elizabethan times, when English nobility were horrified to see the Gaelic chieftains not just eating at the same table as their poets, but often from the same dish. Eventually classical literature and the Romantic literature that grew from the troubadour tradition of the langue d'oc superseded the material that would have been familiar to the ancient fili.

Legacy

Many manuscripts preserving the tales once transmitted by the fili have survived.  This literature contributes much to the modern understanding of druids, Celtic religion and the Celtic world in general.

Besides its value to historians, this canon has contributed a great deal to modern literature beginning with retellings by William Butler Yeats and other authors involved with the Celtic Revival.  Soon after, James Joyce drew from material less explicitly.  Now fantasy literature and art draws heavily from these tales and characters such as Cúchulainn, Finn McCool and the Tuatha Dé Danann are relatively familiar.

Through such traditional musicians as Turlough O'Carolan (who died in 1738 and is often lauded as "the last of the bards") and countless of his less-known or anonymous colleagues, the musical tradition of the fili has made its way to contemporary ears via artists such as Planxty, The Chieftains, and The Dubliners.

In their subject matter and techniques, the seanachie are considered the inheritors of the ancient Irish tradition of oral literature.

The modern Irish and Scottish Gaelic words for "poet" are derived from fili.

Old Irish: fili, plural filid
Modern Irish: file, plural filí
Scottish Gaelic: filidh, plural filidhean
 Manx Gaelic: feelee

Finally, practitioners of Celtic Reconstructionist Paganism are working to reconstruct trance and visionary techniques that were used by the filid, such as imbas forosnai and aspects of the tarbhfeis ritual.

See also

Bard
Contention of the bards
Druid
Early Irish literature
Gorsedd
Rhapsode
Seanachie
Skald
Vates

References

  (Filidh)

Ancient Ireland
Scottish folklore
Medieval performers
Irish poetry
Medieval Ireland
Scottish poetry